Day Mamaq (also Romanized as Dāy Mamaq and Dāymamaq; also known as Dā’ī Māmā, Daymana, and Dāymaq) is a village in Bakrabad Rural District, in the Central District of Varzaqan County, East Azerbaijan Province, Iran. At the 2006 census, its population was 52, in 13 families.

References 

Towns and villages in Varzaqan County